Loricaria birindellii is a species of catfish in the family Loricariidae. It is native to South America, where it occurs in the Curuá River, a tributary of the Iriri River, which is itself a tributary of the Xingu River, with its type locality being listed as the municipality of Altamira in the state of Pará in Brazil. The species reaches 36.5 cm (14.4 inches) in total length, can weigh up to at least 118.2 g, and is believed to be a facultative air-breather.

References 

Fish described in 2010
Loricariini